The 2014–15 Euro Hockey Tour was the 19th season of Euro Hockey Tour. It started on 6 November 2014 and finished on 25 April 2015. A total of 24 games were played, with each team playing 12 games. The season consists of the Karjala Tournament, the Channel One Cup, and three rounds of double headers. An interrupted game between Sweden and Finland on 6 February 2015 did not count towards the final standings and was not replayed. Sweden won the tournament.

Total standings

Karjala Tournament

The 2014 Karjala Tournament was played between 6–9 November 2014, and was won by Sweden. Five of the matches were played in Helsinki, Finland, and one match in Leksand, Sweden.

Channel One Cup

The Channel One Cup was played between 18–21 December 2014, and was won by Russia. Five of the matches were played in Sochi, Russia, and one match in Prague, Czech Republic.

Results 
The game in Prague is UTC+1, while the games in Sochi are UTC+3.

Double headers, February 5–8
The first game between Sweden and Finland played on 6 February in Västerås was interrupted during the second period and was not continued. The interrupted game does not count as a national team game.

Results
All games are UTC+1.

Double headers, April 16–19

Results
The games played in Sweden are UTC+2 and the games played in Finland are UTC+3.

Double headers, April 22–25

Results
The games played in Czech Republic are UTC+2 and the games played in Russia are UTC+3.

References

 
Euro Hockey Tour
2014–15 in European ice hockey